The Information Branch, also the Information Department (commonly known as al-maʿlumāt "The Information"), is the intelligence unit of the Lebanese Internal Security Forces Directorate, founded on August 6, 1993 under decree No.  3904. Its main tasks include gathering national and military intelligence, criminal investigation, espionage, counterintelligence, and counter-terrorism.
Acting as a counterweight to the Lebanese Armed Forces's intelligence unit, the newly-formed security apparatus was largely trained and supplied by the United States, France, and Germany. Trained in the Alps, its Strike Force is equipped with advanced firearms and devices.
It is considered one of the most powerful intelligence agencies in the Middle East, and its members have been subject of assassinations and assassination attempts.

See also
 General Directorate of General Security
 Lebanese State Security
 October 2012 Beirut bombing

References

Lebanese intelligence agencies
1993 establishments in Lebanon
Government agencies established in 1993